Deutz Technische Hochschule is an underground station on the Cologne Stadtbahn lines 1 and 9, located in the Cologne district of Deutz. The station lies on Deutz-Kalker Straße.

The station was opened in 1983 and consists of two side platforms with two rail tracks.

Notable places nearby 
 Lanxess Arena
 Cologne University of Applied Sciences

See also 
 List of Cologne KVB stations

External links 

 station info page 
 

Cologne KVB stations
Innenstadt, Cologne
Railway stations in Germany opened in 1983